"Liebe macht blind" [Love makes you blind] is a single by The Busters and Farin Urlaub. It's the last track from The Busters' album 360°.

"Like This", is also written by and features Farin and it also appears on 360°, right before "Liebe macht blind". "Let's talk about" was originally released on The Busters album Welcome to Busterland, but for the single they recorded a new version of the song.

Video
Farin sits on a high chair and looks around with binoculars, possibly playing a lifeguard. He then notices a pretty woman and falls off the chair, getting sand in his eyes. He stands up and looks for the woman, but, because he's partially blind, he annoys many people and falls several times. The woman teases him and when he finally finds her, she wipes the sand off his face and they walk away together. Meanwhile, the Busters sit in a row elsewhere on the beach.

Track listing
 "Liebe macht blind" (Urlaub) - 3:12
 "Like This" (Urlaub) - 3:21
 "Let's Talk About" (The Busters) - 3:50

2000 singles
Songs written by Farin Urlaub
Farin Urlaub songs
2000 songs